Antwaan Randle El (born August 17, 1979) is an American football coach and former player who was a wide receiver in the National Football League (NFL) for nine seasons. He is currently the wide receivers coach for the Detroit Lions of the National Football League (NFL).  He attended Indiana University where he played college football for the Indiana Hoosiers, and also played basketball and baseball as well. For a time, he was also a sideline reporter for the Big Ten Network for interconference games that the Indiana football team plays.

Following four years at Indiana, Randle El was chosen in the second round (62nd overall) of the 2002 NFL Draft, by the Pittsburgh Steelers. Playing with the Steelers for four seasons, he was active in all 64 regular season games with 23 starts, finding success as a wide receiver, kick returner and punt returner. He was also instrumental in a number of trick plays, including throwing a touchdown pass as a wide receiver for the Steelers in Super Bowl XL against the Seattle Seahawks, the only wide receiver in Super Bowl history to do so. After the 2005 NFL season, Randle El was signed as a free agent to the Washington Redskins. As a receiver for the Redskins, he scored ten touchdowns, catching eight and throwing two. In 2007, Randle El was sidelined for a game against the Buffalo Bills with a hamstring injury. This was the only inactive game of his NFL career.

Randle El was released by the Redskins in March 2010, re-signing with the Pittsburgh Steelers shortly after. Randle El was also named fifth in USA Today'''s All-Decade kick returners.

Early years
Randle El was born in Riverdale, Illinois as the son of Curtis Randle El Sr., a food distributor, and Jacqueline, a day-care provider. Randle El was raised a Pentecostal Christian. A Chicago Bears fan, he attended Thornton Township High School in Harvey, Illinois, where he played football, basketball, and baseball. He was a high school teammate of former NFL linebacker Napoleon Harris, as well as NBA center Melvin Ely and former NFL wide receiver Tai Streets.

After graduating from Thornton Township in 1997, Randle El was drafted in the 1997 Major League Baseball Draft, selected in the 14th round (424th overall) by the Chicago Cubs. He opted instead to pursue a football scholarship at Indiana University, despite being told he was too small during the recruiting process.

College career
Randle El attended Indiana University from 1997 to 2001, playing college football primarily as a quarterback. Due to a low SAT score, he sat out his first full technical year at Indiana as a partial academic qualifier. Playing for the first time in Indiana's 1998 season opener against the Western Michigan Broncos, Randle El completed 22-of-29 passing attempts for 385 yards, three touchdowns, and no interceptions, as well as rushing for 82 yards on 23 carries for three touchdowns. The Hoosiers would go on to win the game, 45–30, with Randle El's 467 yards breaking the NCAA freshman total offense record in his first collegiate game. His performance was also the third all-time highest passing yards in a single game for Indiana, and would earn Randle El the co-Big Ten Player of the Week award. In the same season, Randle El would lead the team to victory over the Iowa Hawkeyes on October 17, 1998, with a rushing touchdown in the final seconds of the game. The win came after a 62–0 loss to Iowa the previous season, making Indiana the first team in the history of the Big Ten Conference to lose to a team by more than 60 points in one season, and beat them the following year. Randle El would win the Big Ten Player of the Week award for a second time for his performance. On December 1, 1998, Randle El was announced as the winner of the 1998 Big Ten Freshman of the Year award, voted for by both Conference coaches and the media. The award was later re-titled the "Thompson-Randle El Freshman of the Year" award, partly in honor of Randle El's successful college career. Over the course of the 1998 season, Randle El tallied four 100-yard rushing games, against the Minnesota Golden Gophers, the Michigan Wolverines, the Michigan State Spartans, and the Cincinnati Bearcats. He finished the season and his freshman year with 1,745 passing yards and six touchdowns, as well as 873 yards rushing as a quarterback, breaking the Indiana University season record.

While at Indiana, Randle El became the first player in NCAA Division I history to pass for 40 career touchdowns and score 40 career rushing touchdowns. In 2001, he was awarded the Chicago Tribune Silver Football, presented by the Chicago Tribune to the Most Valuable Player of the Big Ten Conference. He finished his collegiate career as fifth on the all-time NCAA total yardage list, and became the first player in college football history to record 2,500 total yards for each of four consecutive years. Tallying 7,469 passing yards, 3,895 rushing yards, and 92 touchdowns running and passing for his college career, he finish sixth in the Heisman Trophy voting in his senior season. Randle El ended his college career with a 26–15 win over the Kentucky Wildcats, passing for two touchdowns.

In 2000, Penn State head coach Joe Paterno said of Randle El, "He is just the whole offense. It is scary to watch him. He is so quick that if you don't get on him and you wait for him to pitch the ball, he will take off on you. He is just an amazing athlete. I don't know how you get ready for him."

While attending Indiana, Randle El also played varsity basketball under Hall of Fame head coach Bob Knight. Randle El joined the 1998–99 Indiana basketball team following the football season. In the 1998–99 season, Randle El played 11 games for the basketball team, averaging 1.5 points and 0.7 rebounds in 6.7 minutes per game. He also played varsity baseball during the 2000 season for Indiana University.

In November 2012, Randle El was inducted into the Indiana Athletic Hall of Fame.

Professional career

Pittsburgh Steelers (2002–2005)
Randle El was drafted as a wide receiver in the second round of the 2002 NFL Draft with the 62nd overall pick by the Pittsburgh Steelers. He was the ninth wide receiver to be selected in the 2002 NFL Draft. He earned AFC Special Teams Player of the Week for his game against Baltimore in Week 8. As a rookie, he had 47 receptions for 489 receiving yards and two receiving touchdowns. He was named to the NFL All-Rookie Team.

In Week 8 of the 2003 season, Randle El earned AFC Special Teams Player of the Week for his game against St. Louis. He had an 84-yard punt return for a touchdown in the game. In the 2003 season, Randle El finished with 37 receptions for 364 receiving yards and one receiving touchdown.

The Steelers made him their top kickoff returner through the 2004 season, and their top punt returner. In Week 15, against the New York Giants, he threw his first professional touchdown pass on a 10-yard catch by Verron Haynes. He finished the 2004 season with 43 receptions for 601 receiving yards and three receiving touchdowns.

In Week 10 of the 2005 season, against the Cleveland Browns, Randle El threw a 51-yard touchdown pass to Hines Ward. In the 2005 season, he finished with 35 receptions for 558 receiving yards and one receiving touchdown. He had a game-clinching 43-yard reverse touchdown pass to Hines Ward in the fourth quarter of Super Bowl XL, his only championship title. He was the third non-quarterback and the first and only wide receiver in NFL history to throw a touchdown pass in the Super Bowl.

Washington Redskins (2006–2009)
During the free agency period in March 2006, Randle El signed a seven-year deal with the Washington Redskins, worth $31 million with $11.5 million in bonuses. He had initially been in talks to sign a six-year, $18 million contract with the Chicago Bears, but discussions had broken down following the first day of free agency. In the Redskins' Week 7 game against the Indianapolis Colts, he returned a punt 87 yards for a touchdown in the second quarter, his first punt return for a touchdown with the Redskins, then in Week 17, he passed for his first touchdown as a Redskin, completing a 48-yard pass to wide receiver Santana Moss. In the 2006 season, he finished with 32 receptions for 351 receiving yards and three receiving touchdowns.

In the 2007 season opener against the Miami Dolphins, Randle El recorded five receptions for a career-high 162 yards.

In addition, he was the Redskins' emergency quarterback. In December 2007, Randle El was inactive in a loss to Buffalo with a hamstring injury. This was his first game missed in his six-year NFL career, ending a run of 91 consecutive regular season starts. In the 2007 season, Randle El finished with 51 receptions for	728 receiving yards and one receiving touchdown. In the Wild Card Round against Seattle, Randle El had ten receptions for 94 receiving yards and one receiving touchdown in the 35–14 loss.

In the 2008 season, Randle El recorded 53 receptions for 593 receiving yards and four receiving touchdowns. In the 2009 season, Randle El recorded 50 receptions for 530 receiving yards in 16 games. In January 2010, Randle El was named in the Bleacher Report's Pittsburgh Steelers All-Decade team for defense and special teams, as a punt returner. He was also named fifth in USA Today's All-Decade kick returners. Randle El was among ten players released by the Redskins on March 4, 2010. The move came as a result of a number of personnel changes in Washington, with new head coach and executive vice president Mike Shanahan – signed alongside new offensive coordinator Kyle Shanahan - opting to make room in the Redskin's depth chart and salary outgoings in preparation of the 2010 free agency period. Randle El stated that he was "shocked" at the move, commenting that "..with a new GM and a new coach, I thought you'd be given a shot to show them what you can do."

Pittsburgh Steelers (second stint)
On March 8, 2010, Randle El again signed with the Pittsburgh Steelers in a three-year deal worth $7 million, with a $900,000 signing bonus. He was active in all sixteen regular season games, with 22 receptions for 253 yards. In a Week 4 loss to the Baltimore Ravens, Randle El was the team's leading receiver with 50 yards, including a season-longest 34-yard catch. Following the Steelers bye week, Randle El had a twelve-yard receiving touchdown overturned, in a week six loss to the New Orleans Saints. In Week 9, Randle El threw for a touchdown pass to wide receiver Mike Wallace in a win over the Cincinnati Bengals, following a hand-off from Ben Roethlisberger. Randle El threw for a second passing touchdown in the Steelers' final regular season game against the Cleveland Browns, completing a pass to Hines Ward. The pass added to his career passer rating of 157.5 from 21 completed passes of a possible 26, the highest career rating of any player with more than twenty completions. Randle El scored a rushing two-point conversion in Super Bowl XLV to bring the Steelers to within three points of Green Bay in the fourth quarter.  He was released by the team on July 28, 2011.

Retirement
After not playing during the 2011 season, Randle El announced his retirement from professional football on July 13, 2012. In 2013, he became the athletic director at Virginia Academy in Ashburn, Virginia, a Christian high school he helped found.

In a 2016 interview with the Pittsburgh Post-Gazette, Randle El expressed regret over playing professional football due to growing memory problems and difficulty walking up and down stairs that he has faced since retirement. He mentioned that he could still be playing baseball at his age had he pursued that path after being drafted by the Chicago Cubs.

Coaching career
Tampa Bay Buccaneers
On January 16, 2019, Randle El joined the coaching staff of the Tampa Bay Buccaneers as an offensive assistant, reuniting with his former wide receivers coach and offensive coordinator Bruce Arians. Randle El was a part of the coaching staff of the Buccaneers team that won Super Bowl LV.

Detroit Lions
On February 9, 2021, it was announced that Randle El was hired by the Detroit Lions as their new wide receivers coach under Head Coach Dan Campbell.

Personal life
Randle El's younger brother, Marcus, was a wide receiver and kick returner for the University of Wisconsin, while his older brother, Curtis, was a defensive back at Indiana University. Randle El is married. The couple have four children. Randle El also has three children from previous relations. In total, he has seven children. Randle El is a Christian.

Randle El co-hosted Redskins Gameday'' on WTTG during the 2007 season. Randle El participated in the coverage of the 2008 NFC Divisional playoff game between the New York Giants and the Philadelphia Eagles for NFL Network, holding an interview after the game with safety Brian Dawkins. The next week, he traveled to cover the AFC championship game between his former team, the Pittsburgh Steelers, and the Baltimore Ravens. After the game, he held interviews with some of his former teammates, including Ben Roethlisberger, Troy Polamalu, and Hines Ward.

Randle El made several appearances in television commercials for Easterns Automotive Group, a local car dealership group on the DC and Baltimore areas, alongside Chris Cooley, Clinton Portis, Jason Campbell, Chief Zee, Santana Moss, Willis McGahee.

References

External links

Detroit Lions coaching bio

1979 births
Living people
Sportspeople from Cook County, Illinois
Players of American football from Illinois
African-American coaches of American football
African-American players of American football
American football quarterbacks
American football return specialists
American football wide receivers
Indiana Hoosiers football players
Indiana Hoosiers men's basketball players
Indiana Hoosiers baseball players
Pittsburgh Steelers players
Washington Redskins players
College football announcers
National Football League announcers
People from Riverdale, Illinois
American men's basketball players
Tampa Bay Buccaneers coaches
Detroit Lions coaches
21st-century African-American sportspeople
20th-century African-American sportspeople